The International Scuba Diving Hall of Fame (ISDHF) is an annual event that recognizes those who have contributed to the success and growth of recreational scuba diving in dive travel, entertainment, art, equipment design and development, education, exploration and adventure. It was founded in 2000 by the Cayman Islands Ministry of Tourism. Currently, it exists virtually with plans for a physical facility to be built at a future time.

Hall of Fame inductees
This is a list of the inductees who are honored in the International Scuba Diving Hall of Fame.

Early pioneers

 
 George Williamson

2000

2002

2003

2004

2005

2007

 Cornell Burke (Honouree)
  
 Neville Darvin Ebanks (Honouree)

2008

 
 James Dailey (Honouree)
 
 Kem Jackson (Honouree)

2009

2010

2011

2012

2013

2015

 Nancy Easterbrook (Honouree)
 
 
 Gladys B. Howard (Honouree) 
  
 
 Dr. James Poulson (Honouree)

2016

 
 
 
 
  (Early pioneer)
 Dr. 
  (Early pioneer)
  (Early pioneer)

2017

 
 
 
 
  (Significant Career Achievement and/or Industry Contribution)

2018

 
  
 
 
 
  (Honoured posthumously 2018 Early Pioneer Award)

2019

2020

References

External links

Caymanian awards
Awards established in 2000
Underwater diving awards
Halls of fame in the United Kingdom